Minerva: A Review of Science, Learning and Policy is a quarterly peer-reviewed academic journal covering the sociological study of scientific knowledge and research. It was established in 1962, replacing a series of bulletins that had been published by the Congress for Cultural Freedom's Committee on Science and Freedom beginning in 1954. It is published by Springer Science+Business Media and the editor-in-chief is Peter Weingart (Bielefeld University). Since 2013, the journal's home institution has been the Institute for Interdisciplinary Studies of Science (I²SOS) at Bielefeld University.

Editors-in-chief
Past editors-in-chief of Minerva are:
Roy MacLeod (2000–2008)
Michael Shattock (1995–1999)
Edward Shils (1962–1994)

Literature 
 Roy MacLeod: Consensus, Civility, and Community: The Origins of Minerva and the Vision of Edward Shils, in: Minerva, September 2016, Volume 54, Issue 3, pp 255–292.

References

External links

Publications established in 1962
Quarterly journals
Sociology of scientific knowledge
Sociology journals
Springer Science+Business Media academic journals
English-language journals
Congress for Cultural Freedom
CIA activities in Germany